Stone rubbing is the practice of creating an image of surface features of a stone on paper. The image records features such as natural textures, inscribed patterns or lettering. By rubbing hard rendering materials over the paper, pigment is deposited over protrusions and on edges; depressions remain unpigmented since the pliable paper moves away from the rendering material. Common rendering materials include rice paper, charcoal, wax, graphite or inksticks. Over time, the practice of stone rubbing can cause permanent damage to cultural monuments due to abrasion. For an artist, stone rubbings can become an entire body of creative work that is framed and displayed.

Technique
The paper that has been used by Chinese scholars to transfer the calligraphy from stones is made from plant fiber. It can be used in two ways to retrieve the calligraphy. One way requires the paper to be dry and then adhered to the stone through a paste made with water and a starch that is made from rice or wheat. The paper is then tamped into the engravings on the stone. The other technique requires the paper to be wet and tamped into the engravings without a paste.

After doing either of these techniques, an ink, created through grinding an ink stick and adding water one drop at a time to achieve the ideal consistency, is used to retrieve the calligraphy. The ink is stippled on with a cloth filled with the ink. The ink covers the paper without sinking into the engravings. When the paper is peeled off, the calligraphy engravings come out white, while everything else is black from the ink.

More commonly, people use butcher paper to create stone rubbings. The butcher paper is usually taped on to the stone or grave, which contains the inscription desired, with either masking or paint tape. Then, usually, charcoal or crayon is rubbed over the stone or grave, leaving the engravings untouched by the crayon. When the butcher paper is removed, the inscriptions should be readable because they are not marked with the crayon.

It can be helpful to clean the stone beforehand, to ensure optimum results. A soft brush and water is usually what works best to cleanse the stones. One should not use stiff or hard brushes, as they can scratch the stone. Also, one should not use cleaning solutions or mild detergents on the stones, as they can damage the stone.

When stone rubbing, one should be careful with stones that are deteriorating, as they can collapse under pressure.

Gravestone rubbing
Gravestone rubbing also applies this technique to gravestones, often as a method of retrieving and conserving information about genealogy. For a genealogist, a gravestone rubbing may become a permanent record of death when a gravestone is rapidly deteriorating. 

Rubbings are commonly made by visitors to the US Vietnam Veterans Memorial. Visitors use pencil and paper to copy the name of a family member or friend who died during the Vietnam War off of the wall. The rubbing forms a type of souvenir.

Gravestone rubbing can be used to teach about local history. The stone’s condition, art, and inscription can tell what was going on in an area at a specific time. Studying multiple gravestones in one specific area can give even more information about history.

See also
 Brass rubbing
 Frottage (art)
 Ishizuri-e

Notes

Artistic techniques
Burial monuments and structures